The Democratic Party (Partito Democratico, PD) was a social liberal political party in Italy.

It emerged in 1913 from the left-wing of the dominant Liberals, of which it continued to be a government coalition partner until 1919. In the 1913 general election the party won 2.8% of the vote and 11 seats in the Chamber of Deputies. In 1919 the PD was merged with other liberal parties and groupings in the Social Democracy party, that gained 10.9% and 60 seats in the 1919 general election, while other Democrats joined Liberal–Radical joint lists.

Electoral results

References

Liberal parties in Italy
Defunct political parties in Italy
Social liberal parties
Political parties established in 1913
Political parties disestablished in 1919
1919 disestablishments in Italy
1913 establishments in Italy